Talaja may refer to:

People
 Roope Talaja (born 1988), Finnish ice hockey player
 Silvija Talaja (born 1978), Croatian tennis player

Places
 Talaja Caves, India
 Talaja, Bhavnagar, India
 Talaja (Vidhan Sabha constituency)

See also
 Talaya, Russia